Giovanni Battista di Giovannofrio, also known as Giovanni Battista di Norcia  was an Italian painter, active in a Renaissance style. He is the brother of the painter, Giacomo Giovannofrio.

He painted a fresco depicting an Enthroned Madonna between Saints Claudio (or Eligius) and St Antony Abbot, and a donor while above is a Coronation of the Virgin, dated 1497, and painted for the church of Sant'Agostino in Norcia. He also painted a Glory of St Anthony of Padua (1501) for the church of San Francesco in Norcia.

References

Year of birth unknown
Year of death unknown
15th-century Italian painters
Italian male painters
16th-century Italian painters
Italian Renaissance painters
Umbrian painters